Afsar Uddin Ahmed was a National Awami Party politician and a Jatiya Sangsad member representing the Chittagong-13 constituency.

Career
Ahmed was elected to parliament from Chittagong-13 as a Jatiya Party candidate in 1986 and 1988. He served as the President of Chittagong City unit of Bangladesh Awami League.

References

National Awami Party politicians
Awami League politicians
3rd Jatiya Sangsad members
4th Jatiya Sangsad members
Year of birth missing
Year of death missing
Recipients of the Ekushey Padak